Mesonacis is an extinct genus of trilobite that lived during the Botomian, found in North-America (excluding Greenland), and the United Kingdom (North-Western Scotland). Some of the species now regarded part of Mesonacis, have previously been assigned to Angustolenellus or Olenellus (Angustolenellus). Angustolenellus is now regarded a junior synonym of Mesonacis.

Etymology 
M. vermontanus is named after the State of Vermont, where it was collected. 
M. bonnensis is called after the Bonne Bay, Newfoundland, where the species is found. 
M. eagerensis refers to the Eager Formation, British Columbia, in which it occurs.
M. hamoculus is derived from the Latin hamus, meaning hooked, and oculus, meaning eye.

Distribution 
M. vermontanus occurs in the middle Upper Olenellus-zone of Vermont (Parker Slate, Georgia).

M. bonnensis has been found in the Olenellus-zone of Newfoundland, Canada (Forteau Formation, East shore of the Bonne Bay East Arm).

M. cylindricus was collected in the Upper Olenellus-zone of California (Eagle Mountain Shale, Carrara Formation, Grapeville Mountains, White/Inyo Mountains, South end of the Marble Mountains, and in San Bernardino County).

M. eagerensis is present in the Olenellus-zone of British Columbia, Canada (Eager Formation, just South of the Fort Steel-St. Eugene Mission road, 6 miles North-East of Cranbrook).

M. fremonti was excavated in California from the Olenellus-zone (Pyramid Shale Member, Carrara Formation, Funeral Mountains, Resting Spring Range, and Salt Spring Hills), the Lower Olenellus-zone (Upper Poleta and lower Harkless Formations) and the Upper Olenellus-zone (middle part of the Latham Shale, at the Southern end of the Marble Mountains; Latham Shale, Marble Mountains, ½ mile East of Cadiz; the Mohave Desert portion of San Bernardino County; the Mule Spring Limestone, White/Inyo Mountains region), and in Nevada (arenaceous shales at the summit of Prospect Mountain, Eureka County).

M. hamoculus occurs in the Olenellus-zone of Scotland (Loch Awe).

Description 
As with most early trilobites, Mesonacis has an almost flat exoskeleton that is only thinly calcified, and has crescent-shaped eye ridges with a total length up to 2.8 inches in some fossils from the early cambrian. As part of the suborder Olenellina, Mesonacis lacks dorsal sutures. Like all other members of the superfamily Olenelloidea, the eye-ridges spring from the back of the frontal lobe (L4) of the central area of the cephalon, that is called glabella. Mesonacis also shares the typical character of whole family Olenellidae in that the frontal (L3) and middle pair (L2) of lateral lobes of the glabella are partially merged. This creates two very typical, isolated slits. The exoskeleton of Mesonacis is about 2⅓× as long as wide, measured between the genal angles. The outer ⅓ of the back (or posterior margin) of the headshield (or cephalon) angles forwards from the tip of the pleural spine to the genal angle. The central area of the cephalon (or glabella) and the frontal margin touch or the distance is as long as the margin at most (in jargon: the preglabellar field is short or absent). The thorax has approximately 25 segments, the pleura about 1½× as wide as the axis, excluding the genal spines. The 3rd segment carries extra large pleural spines (or macropleural spines) that reach back only to the tip of the 5th pleural spines. The segments look degenerated behind the 15th (or an opisthothorax can be distinguished). The tailshield (or pygidium) is very small and subquadrate in shape, and carries one or two pairs of small marginal spines.

Key to the species

References

Sources 
Photo of M. vermontanus

External links
 Trilobite info

Olenellidae
Redlichiida genera
Cambrian trilobites
Extinct animals of North America